Semprit (Indonesian: kue semprit, Malay: kuih semperit) is made of wheat flour, corn starch, custard powder, sugar and margarine. These ingredients are mixed together to become a dough. Next, the dough is rolled and cut into small pieces, which are baked until golden yellow. Semprit is ready to eat once it has cooled to room temperature.

See also

 Kue semprong
 Putri salju

References

Cookies
Indonesian cuisine
Malaysian cuisine
Malay cuisine